Eupithecia mejala is a moth in the  family Geometridae. It is found in Ecuador, Bolivia and Peru.

References

Moths described in 1899
mejala
Moths of South America